Euriphene saphirina is a butterfly in the family Nymphalidae. It is found in the Democratic Republic of the Congo, Uganda, Rwanda, Burundi, Kenya, Tanzania, Zambia and Angola. The habitat consists of forests.

The larvae feed on Trichocladus ellipticus.

Subspecies
E. s. saphirina (Uganda, Rwanda, Burundi, western Kenya, north-western Tanzania, Democratic Republic of the Congo: Ubangi, Mongala, Uele, Ituri, north Kivu, Tshopo, Tshuapa, Equateur, Cataractes)
E. s. itanii (Carcasson, 1964) (Tanzania: eastern shore of Lake Tanganyika)
E. s. memoria Hecq, 1994 (Tanzania)
E. s. trioculata (Talbot, 1927) (southern Democratic Republic of the Congo, Zambia, Angola)

References

Butterflies described in 1894
Euriphene
Butterflies of Africa